Semenoviolidae is an extinct family of earwigs in the order Dermaptera. There are at least two genera and two described species in Semenoviolidae.

Genera
These two genera belong to the family Semenoviolidae:
 † Semenoviola Martynov, 1925
 † Semenovioloides Vishnyakova, 1980

References

Earwigs
Prehistoric insect families